Yurisleidy Lupetey Cobas (born May 6, 1981) is a Cuban judoka. The 2001 World Champion in the -57 kg division, at the 2004 Summer Olympics she won the bronze medal in the women's Lightweight (– 57 kg) category, together with Deborah Gravenstijn of the Netherlands.

She also competed at the 2008 and 2012 Summer Olympics.

References

External links
 

1981 births
Living people
Judoka at the 2004 Summer Olympics
Judoka at the 2008 Summer Olympics
Judoka at the 2012 Summer Olympics
Olympic judoka of Cuba
Olympic bronze medalists for Cuba
Olympic medalists in judo
Medalists at the 2004 Summer Olympics
Cuban female judoka
Pan American Games gold medalists for Cuba
Pan American Games medalists in judo
Universiade medalists in judo
Central American and Caribbean Games gold medalists for Cuba
Competitors at the 2006 Central American and Caribbean Games
Judoka at the 2003 Pan American Games
Universiade gold medalists for Cuba
Central American and Caribbean Games medalists in judo
Medalists at the 2003 Pan American Games
20th-century Cuban women
21st-century Cuban women